Lee Richardson (born October 31, 1947) is a Canadian businessman and politician.

Richardson was first elected to Parliament in the 1988 election as a Progressive Conservative representing the riding of Calgary Southeast.

In 1993 Richardson returned to a successful career in business, community service and philanthropy.

He was re-elected in 2004, winning four consecutive elections in the constituency of Calgary Centre.

Richardson announced his resignation from the House of Commons on May 30, 2012, in order to accept an appointment as Principal Secretary to the Premier of Alberta.

Education

Richardson was born in North Battleford, Saskatchewan. He was educated at Calgary schools, the University of Calgary and the University of Alberta. He also attended Oxford University, England.

Personal life 
Married to Susanne Reece in 1971, they had three children: Michael, Jill, and Jane.

The family lost Susanne to cancer in 1998.

Early career

Richardson first entered federal politics serving on Parliament Hill as Executive Assistant to former Prime Minister John Diefenbaker from 1972 to 1974.

From 1974 to 1983 he served successively as Executive Assistant, Director of the Office of the Premier and Chief of Staff to Alberta Premier Peter Lougheed.

In 1983 Richardson returned to Ottawa to serve as Deputy Chief of Staff to the newly elected Progressive Conservative leader and Leader of the Opposition Brian Mulroney.

After the 1984 federal election, Richardson served as Prime Minister Mulroney's Deputy Chief of Staff and Special Advisor on Western Affairs. Richardson remained in the Prime Minister's Office until he ran in the 1988 general election in the federal riding of Calgary Southeast. Richardson won with 62.67% of the vote. Richardson's candidacy was the first political endorsement of Peter Lougheed following his retirement.

In his first term as a Parliamentarian, Richardson served as Parliamentary Secretary to the Minister of Communications, and the Minister of Transport. He was instrumental in relocating the National Energy Board to Calgary and placing the Calgary International Airport under local authority. Richardson was defeated in the 1993 federal election by Jan Brown, a Reform Party candidate.

Richardson was a member representing the Government of Canada on the board of directors for Calgary Olympic Organizing Committee of the 1988 Winter Olympics.

Corporate and community service 
He returned to Calgary in 1993 to form Lee Richardson Financial Corporation. He has over 20 years of corporate experience in senior executive roles at six publicly traded corporations including: President of In-Flight Phone Canada, President of Goldtex Resources, Chairman of the Board of ACD Systems Inc. (TSE), and Chairman of the Board of Streetlight Intelligence Inc.

Richardson served on the Board of Directors of  the 1988 Winter Olympics; on the Board of Southminster United Church; and continues to serve as a board member of the Calgary Homeless Foundation.

He was Chair of the Advisory Board to the University of Calgary Institute for the Humanities and was on the faculty of the Banff Centre School of Management for ten years.

Richardson currently is on the Calgary Stampede Board of Directors and is a Calgary Flames Ambassador.

Richardson received the Queen Elizabeth II Silver Jubilee Medal in 1977 "in recognition of significant contribution to compatriots, community and to Canada", the 125th Anniversary of the Confederation of Canada Medal in 1992, the Alberta Centennial Medal in 2005 "in  recognition of outstanding service to the people and province of Alberta", and the Queen Elizabeth II Diamond Jubilee Medal in 2012 " in recognition of your contributions to Canada".

Return to federal politics

Richardson returned to federal politics in 2004, winning election in the electoral district of Calgary Centre which had previously been held by PC Leader Joe Clark. Re-elected in 2006, capturing 55.4%  of the vote and a 20,000 vote plurality, he was again re-elected with 55.6%   of the vote in 2008 and 57.7%  in the general election of 2011.

Among his parliamentary duties Richardson first served on the Environment Committee where he became the only Conservative to win the Sierra Club's "Green Parliamentarian" award.

Richardson was appointed Chair of the House of Commons Standing Committee on Natural Resources in 2006.

From 2007 until 2011 Richardson served as the Chair of the International Trade Committee. According to the Montreal Gazette, "the International Trade Committee, under the genial chair of Conservative Lee Richardson, is a collegial exception to the toxic tone of most House committees."

The International Trade Committee under Richardson chairmanship successfully vetted three free trade agreements. The committee went clause by clause through and referred back to the House the following trade agreements; Bill C-2: An Act to implement the Free Trade Agreement between Canada and the Republic of Colombia, the Agreement on the Environment between Canada and the Republic of Colombia and the Agreement on Labour Cooperation between Canada and the Republic of Colombia (Canada-Colombia Free Trade Agreement Implementation Act), Bill C-8: An Act to implement the Free Trade Agreement between Canada and the Hashemite Kingdom of Jordan, the Agreement on the Environment between Canada and the Hashemite Kingdom of Jordan and the Agreement on Labour Cooperation between Canada and the Hashemite Kingdom of Jordan (Canada-Jordan Free Trade Act) and Bill C-46: An Act to implement the Free Trade Agreement between Canada and the Republic of Panama, the Agreement on the Environment between Canada and the Republic of Panama and the Agreement on Labour Cooperation between Canada and the Republic of Panama (Canada-Panama Free Trade Act).

After the 2011 federal election, Richardson was one of eight Members of Parliament who put their name forward to be the Speaker of the House of Commons. Richardson lasted to the fifth round and placed third.

Resignation

On May 30, 2012 Richardson resigned from Parliament as the Member for Calgary Centre. In his farewell speech he remarked to his colleagues that: "While we advocate for different ideas of Canada, we are all Canadians and we all love our country. We would all, I think, do well to remember that and leave the partisan furies at the water's edge."

Ian MacDonald from the Montreal Gazette remarked that: "while leaders of all parties joined in personal tributes to Richardson, about 200 MPs lined up to shake his hand as he stood at his front-row seat by the door at the far end of the House. It was a good half-hour before he could leave the House. In four decades of attending the House, I’ve never seen anything quite like it."

Similar sentiments were brought forward from the media noting Richardson's ability to be impartial to all sides in the House of Commons and in his riding office where he was willing to help all Calgarians.

Electoral record

Calgary Centre

|-

Calgary South Centre

Results based on redistributed results. Conservative Party change is compared to a combination of Progressive Conservative Party and Canadian Alliance totals.

Calgary Southeast

See also
 Canadian federal election results in Calgary

References

External links

1947 births
Living people
Canadian political consultants
Conservative Party of Canada MPs
Members of the House of Commons of Canada from Alberta
Members of the United Church of Canada
People from North Battleford
Politicians from Calgary
21st-century Canadian politicians